Marcus Epps (born January 27, 1996) is an American football free safety for the Las Vegas Raiders of the National Football League (NFL). He played college football at Wyoming.

Professional career

Minnesota Vikings
Epps was drafted by the Minnesota Vikings in the sixth round, 191st overall, of the 2019 NFL Draft. He was waived on November 6, 2019.

Philadelphia Eagles
On November 7, 2019, Epps was claimed off waivers by the Philadelphia Eagles.

Epps was placed on the reserve/COVID-19 list by the team on November 5, 2020, and activated on November 18.
In Week 15 against the Arizona Cardinals, Epps recorded his first career interception of a pass thrown by Kyler Murray during the 33–26 loss.

Epps was placed on the COVID list on January 3, 2022. He was activated one week later on January 10, missing just one game where the Eagles did not play their starters.

In 2022, Epps reached Super Bowl LVII. In the Super Bowl, Epps record 6 tackles but the Eagles lost 38-35 to the Kansas City Chiefs.

Las Vegas Raiders
On March 16, 2023, Epps signed a two-year contract with the Las Vegas Raiders.

References

External links
Wyoming bio

1996 births
Living people
Players of American football from Los Angeles
American football safeties
Wyoming Cowboys football players
Minnesota Vikings players
Philadelphia Eagles players
Las Vegas Raiders players